David Hilbert (1862–1943), a mathematician, is the eponym of all of the things (and topics) listed below.

Mathematics and physics

Brouwer–Hilbert controversy
Einstein–Hilbert action
Einstein–Hilbert equations
Hilbert algebra
Hilbert C*-module
Hilbert basis (linear programming)
Hilbert class field
Hilbert cube
Hilbert curve
Hilbert curve scheduling
Hilbert field
Hilbert function
Hilbert manifold
Hilbert matrix
Hilbert metric
Hilbert modular form
Hilbert modular variety
Hilbert–Mumford criterion
Hilbert number
Hilbert plane
Hilbert polynomial
Hilbert series
Hilbert ring
Hilbert–Samuel function
Hilbert projection theorem
Hilbert R-tree
Hilbert reciprocity
Hilbert scheme
Hilbert space
Hilbert dimension
Projective Hilbert space
Reproducing kernel Hilbert space
Rigged Hilbert space
Semi-Hilbert space
Hilbert spectrum
Hilbert symbol
Hilbert system
Hilbert transform
Hilbert spectroscopy
Hilbert–Huang transform
Hilbert spectral analysis
Hilbert-style deduction system
Hilbert–Bernays paradox
Hilbert–Bernays provability conditions
Hilbert–Burch theorem
Hilbert–Kunz function
Hilbert–Poincaré series
Hilbert–Pólya conjecture
Hilbert–Schmidt inner product
Hilbert–Schmidt norm
Hilbert–Schmidt operator
Hilbert–Schmidt integral operator
Hilbert–Schmidt theorem
Hilbert–Serre theorem
Hilbert–Smith conjecture
Hilbert–Speiser theorem
Hilbert–Waring theorem
Hilbert's arithmetic of ends
Hilbert's axioms
Hilbert's basis theorem
Hilbert's epsilon calculus
Hilbert's inequality
Hilbert's irreducibility theorem
Hilbert's lemma
Hilbert's Nullstellensatz
Hilbert's paradox of the Grand Hotel
Hilbert's problems
Hilbert's program
Hilbert's syzygy theorem
Hilbert's theorem (differential geometry)
Hilbert's Theorem 90
Riemann–Hilbert correspondence
Riemann–Hilbert problem

Other
David Hilbert Award
Hilbert (crater)

Hilbert, David